The principal common goal of Zionism was to establish a homeland for the Jewish people. Zionism was produced by various philosophers representing different approaches concerning the objective and path that Zionism should follow.

Political Zionism
Political Zionism was led by Theodor Herzl and Max Nordau in Russia. This Zionist Organization approach espoused at the First Zionist Congress aimed at establishing for the Jewish people a publicly and legally assured home in Palestine, which among other items, included initial steps to obtain governmental grants from the established powers that controlled the area. Nathan Birnbaum, a Jew from Vienna was the original father of Political Zionism, yet ever since he defected away from his own movement Theodor Herzl has become known as the face of modern Zionism. In 1890, Birnbaum coined the term "Zionism" and the phrase "Political Zionism" two years later. Birnbaum published a periodical titled 'Self Emancipation' which espoused "the idea of a Jewish renaissance and the resettlement of Palestine." In this idea, Birnbaum was most influenced by Leon Pinsker.

Practical Zionism

Known in Hebrew as Tzionut Ma'asit, Practical Zionism was led by Moshe Leib Lilienblum and Leon Pinsker and molded by the Hovevei Zion organization. This approach opined that firstly there is a need in practical terms to implement Jewish immigration to the Land of Israel, Aliyah, and settlement of the land, as soon as possible, even if a charter over the Land is not obtained.

Synthetic Zionism
Led by Chaim Weizmann, Leo Motzkin and Nahum Sokolow, an approach that advocated a combination of the preceding two approaches.

Labor Zionism

Another division between these generic types of Zionism derives from ideological differences that do not necessarily have to do with Zionism itself, but rather a comprehensive world view held by the people of these different groups regarding the character of the future Jewish State. Led by Nachman Syrkin, Ber Borochov, Haim Arlosoroff, and Berl Katznelson: As opposed to Practical and Political Zionism, Labor Zionism desired to establish an agriculturist society not on the basis of a private-bourgeoisie society, but rather on the basis of moral equality.

Liberal Zionism

General Zionism (or Liberal Zionism) was initially the dominant trend within the Zionist movement from the First Zionist Congress in 1897 until after the First World War. General Zionists identified with the liberal European middle class to which many Zionist leaders such as Herzl and Chaim Weizmann aspired. Liberal Zionism, although not associated with any single party in modern Israel, remains a strong trend in Israeli politics advocating free market principles, democracy and adherence to human rights. Their political arm was one of the ancestors of the modern-day Likud. Kadima, the main centrist party during the 2000s that split from Likud and is now defunct, however, did identify with many of the fundamental policies of Liberal Zionist ideology, advocating among other things the need for Palestinian statehood in order to form a more democratic society in Israel, affirming the free market, and calling for equal rights for Arab citizens of Israel. In 2013, Ari Shavit suggested that the success of the then-new Yesh Atid party (representing secular, middle-class interests) embodied the success of "the new General Zionists."

Dror Zeigerman writes that the traditional positions of the General Zionists—"liberal positions based on social justice, on law and order, on pluralism in matters of State and Religion, and on moderation and flexibility in the domain of foreign policy and security"—are still favored by important circles and currents within certain active political parties.

Philosopher Carlo Strenger describes a modern-day version of Liberal Zionism (supporting his vision of "Knowledge-Nation Israel"), rooted in the original ideology of Herzl and Ahad Ha'am, that stands in contrast to both the romantic nationalism of the right and the Netzah Yisrael of the ultra-Orthodox. It is marked by a concern for democratic values and human rights, freedom to criticize government policies without accusations of disloyalty, and rejection of excessive religious influence in public life. "Liberal Zionism celebrates the most authentic traits of the Jewish tradition: the willingness for incisive debate; the contrarian spirit of davka; the refusal to bow to authoritarianism." Liberal Zionists see that "Jewish history shows that Jews need and are entitled to a nation-state of their own. But they also think that this state must be a liberal democracy, which means that there must be strict equality before the law independent of religion, ethnicity or gender."

Revisionist Zionism

Revisionist Zionism was initially led by Ze'ev Jabotinsky and later by his successor Menachem Begin (later Prime Minister of Israel), and emphasized the romantic elements of Jewish nationality, and the historical heritage of the Jewish people in the Land of Israel as the constituent basis for the Zionist national idea and the establishment of the Jewish State. They supported liberalism, particularly economic liberalism, and opposed Labor Zionism and the establishing of a communist society in the Land of Israel. Revisionist Zionism opposed any restraint in relation to Arab violence and supported firm military action against the Arabs that had attacked the Jewish Community in Mandatory Palestine. Due to that position, a faction of the Revisionist leadership split from that movement in order to establish the underground Irgun. This stream is also categorized as supporters of Greater Israel.

Religious Zionism

Led by Yitzchak Yaacov Reines, founder of Mizrachi (religious Zionism) and by Abraham Isaac Kook. Religious Zionism maintained that Jewish nationality and the establishment of the State of Israel is a religious duty derived from the Torah. As opposed to some parts of the Jewish non-secular community that claimed that the redemption of the Land of Israel will occur only after the coming of the messiah, who will fulfill this aspiration, they maintained that human acts of redeeming the Land will bring about the messiah, as their slogan states: "The land of Israel for the people of Israel according to the Torah of Israel". Today they are commonly referred as the "Religious Nationalists" or the "settlers", and are also categorized as supporters of Greater Israel.

Cultural Zionism

Led by Ahad Ha'am (Asher Zvi Hirsch Ginsberg). Cultural Zionism opined that the fulfillment of the national revival of the Jewish People should be achieved by creating a cultural center in the Land of Israel and an educative center to the Jewish Diaspora, which together will be a bulwark against the danger of assimilation that threatens the existence of the Jewish People.

Revolutionary Zionism
Led by Avraham Stern, Israel Eldad and Uri Zvi Greenberg. Revolutionary Zionism viewed Zionism as a revolutionary struggle to ingather the Jewish exiles from the Diaspora, revive the Hebrew language as a spoken vernacular and reestablish a Jewish kingdom in the Land of Israel. As members of Lehi during the 1940s, many adherents of Revolutionary Zionism engaged in guerilla warfare against the British administration in an effort to end the British Mandate of Palestine and pave the way for Jewish political independence. Following the State of Israel's establishment leading figures of this stream argued that the creation of the state of Israel was never the goal of Zionism but rather a tool to be used in realizing the goal of Zionism, which they called Malkhut Yisrael (the Kingdom of Israel). Revolutionary Zionists are often mistakenly included among Revisionist Zionists but differ ideologically in several areas. While Revisionists were for the most part secular nationalists who hoped to achieve a Jewish state that would exist as a commonwealth within the British Empire, Revolutionary Zionists advocated a form of national-messianism that aspired towards a vast Jewish kingdom with a rebuilt Temple in Jerusalem. Revolutionary Zionism generally espoused anti-imperialist political views and included both Right-wing and Left-wing nationalists among its adherents. This stream is also categorized as supporters of Greater Israel.

Reform Zionism 

Reform Zionism, also known as Progressive Zionism, is the ideology of the Zionist arm of the Reform or Progressive branch of Judaism. The Association of Reform Zionists of America is the American Reform movement's Zionist organization. Their mission “endeavors to make Israel fundamental to the sacred lives and Jewish identity of Reform Jews. As a Zionist organization, the association champions activities that further enhance Israel as a pluralistic, just and democratic Jewish state.” In Israel, Reform Zionism is associated with the Israel Movement for Progressive Judaism.

See also
 Anti-Zionism
Christian Zionism
 Neo-Zionism
Non-Zionism
 Post-Zionism

References 

 Zion and State: Nation, Class and the Shaping of Modern Israel by Mitchell Cohen

 
Zionism